Peter Dalton Hughes (born 28 July 1932) is a former Australian politician. He was the first leader of the Liberal Party in the Australian Capital Territory House of Assembly.

Hughes, who had joined the Liberal Party in 1969, entered the House of Assembly as a member for Canberra at its inaugural election in 1974 and was elected Liberal leader. In January 1977 he resigned from the Liberal Party, arguing that he could better represent his constituents as an independent (he was succeeded as Liberal leader by James Leedman). He was defeated in 1979.

References

1932 births
Living people
Liberal Party of Australia members of the Australian Capital Territory Legislative Assembly
Independent politicians in Australia
Members of the Australian Capital Territory House of Assembly